Berceto (Parmigiano: ,  or) is a village and comune in Italy, located in the Apennine Mountains on the main road between La Spezia and Parma, in the Taro River valley, in the region of Emilia-Romagna.

The main church in the city is the Duomo of San Moderanno founded in the 9th century and with Lombard era sculptures. Other sights include the remains of the Castle of Berceto as well as those of Pietramogolana and Roccaprebalza. Berceto was the birthplace of condottiero Pier Maria II de' Rossi.

References

External links
 Parish Death Records 1646–1913 - from the Parish of San Lorenzo, villa Lozzola, comune Berceto, Parma,Italy

 
Cities and towns in Emilia-Romagna